Alvan Leigh Adams (born July 19, 1954) is an American former professional basketball player. Adams spent his entire career with the Phoenix Suns and retired in 1988 as the second all-time Suns scorer with 13,910 career points.

College career
During 26 games of the 1973–74 season Adams tied an Oklahoma school record with 21 double-doubles for a season by a Sooner (Garfield Heard, 1969–70 also had 21 in 27 games). That record stood until it was broken by Blake Griffin on February 14, 2009.

Adams is one of only three players in the history of the University of Oklahoma men's basketball program to score at least 40 points and get 20 rebounds in a game along with Wayman Tisdale (61 points, 22 rebounds against Texas–San Antonio in 1983) and Blake Griffin (40 points, 23 rebounds against Texas Tech on February 14, 2009).

He is one of only four Sooners to have his college jersey (#33) retired by the OU program (Wayman Tisdale (#23), Mookie Blaylock (#10) and Stacey King (#33) are the other three).

Professional career
After playing the close of his college career, Adams was selected by the Phoenix Suns with the fourth pick of the 1975 NBA draft. Adams was a rookie on a Suns team whose season included an improbable playoff run that took them all the way to the 1976 NBA Finals. In the same year, he was selected to play in the All-Star Game and won the NBA Rookie of the Year Award as well as being named to the All-NBA Rookie Team.

On February 22, 1977, Adams recorded a triple-double with 47 points, 18 rebounds and 12 assists against the Buffalo Braves. He is one of five players in NBA history (along with Elgin Baylor, Wilt Chamberlain, Russell Westbrook and Vince Carter) to have as many as 46 points and 16 rebounds in a triple-double performance.

Adams's jersey number (33) was retired by the Suns, but on the signing of free agent Grant Hill, Adams granted him permission to wear his familiar No. 33 with the Suns.

Adams is the franchise leader in games played, minutes played, rebounds, and steals; second in field goals made and attempted; third in assists; and fourth in blocks.

He is currently the Suns Vice President for Facility Management for the Footprint Center in Phoenix, AZ.

NBA career statistics

Regular season 

|-
| align="left" | 1975–76
| align="left" | Phoenix
| 80 || – || 33.2 || .469 || – || .735 || 9.1 || 5.6 || 1.5 || 1.5 || 19.0
|-
| align="left" | 1976–77
| align="left" | Phoenix
| 72 || – || 31.6 || .474 || – || .754 || 9.1 || 4.5 || 1.3 || 1.2 || 18.0
|-
| align="left" | 1977–78
| align="left" | Phoenix
| 70 || – || 27.3 || .485 || – || .730 || 8.1 || 3.2 || 1.2 || .9 || 15.5
|-
| align="left" | 1978–79
| align="left" | Phoenix
| 77 || – || 30.7 || .530 || – || .799 || 9.2 || 4.7 || 1.4 || .8 || 17.8
|-
| align="left" | 1979–80
| align="left" | Phoenix
| 75 || – || 28.9 || .531 || .000 || .797 || 8.1 || 4.3 || 1.4 || .7 || 14.9
|-
| align="left" | 1980–81
| align="left" | Phoenix
| 75 || – || 27.4 || .526 || .000 || .768 || 7.3 || 4.6 || 1.4 || .9 || 14.9
|-
| align="left" | 1981–82
| align="left" | Phoenix
| 79 || 75 || 30.3 || .494 || .000 || .781 || 7.4 || 4.5 || 1.4 || 1.0 || 15.1
|-
| align="left" | 1982–83
| align="left" | Phoenix
| 80 || 75 || 30.6 || .486 || .333 || .829 || 6.9 || 4.7 || 1.4 || .9 || 14.2
|-
| align="left" | 1983–84
| align="left" | Phoenix
| 70 || 13 || 20.7 || .462 || .000 || .825 || 4.6 || 3.1 || 1.0 || .4 || 9.6
|- 
| align="left" | 1984–85
| align="left" | Phoenix
| 82 || 69 || 26.0 || .520 || .000 || .883 || 6.1 || 3.8 || 1.4 || .6 || 14.7
|-
| align="left" | 1985–86
| align="left" | Phoenix
| 78 || 45 || 25.7 || .502 || .000 || .783 || 6.1 || 4.2 || 1.3 || .6 || 10.8
|-
| align="left" | 1986–87
| align="left" | Phoenix
| 68 || 40 || 24.9 || .503 || .000 || .788 || 5.0 || 3.3 || .9 || .5 || 11.1
|-
| align="left" | 1987–88
| align="left" | Phoenix
| 82 || 25 || 20.1 || .496 || .500 || .844 || 4.5 || 2.2 || 1.0 || .5 || 7.5
|- class="sortbottom"
| style="text-align:center;" colspan="2"| Career
| 988 || 342 || 27.5 || .498 || .133 || .788 || 7.0 || 4.1 || 1.3 || .8 || 14.1
|- class="sortbottom"
| style="text-align:center;" colspan="2"| All-Star
| 1 || 0 || 11.0 || .500 || – || – || 3.0 || – || – || – || 4.0

Playoffs 

|-
| align="left" | 1976
| align="left" | Phoenix
| 19 || – || 35.2 || .452 || – || .817 || 10.1 || 5.2 || 1.4 || 1.1 || 17.9
|-
| align="left" | 1978
| align="left" | Phoenix
| 2 || – || 35.5 || .455 || – || 1.000 || 8.0 || 2.0 || 1.0 || .5 || 16.0 
|-
| align="left" | 1979
| align="left" | Phoenix
| 12 || – || 31.0 || .475. || – || .710 || 7.5 || 4.4 || .9 || 1.0 || 12.8
|-
| align="left" | 1980
| align="left" | Phoenix
| 8 || – || 31.4 || .566 || – || .895 || 9.6 || 5.8 || .9 || 1.3 || 16.1
|-
| align="left" | 1981
| align="left" | Phoenix
| 7 || – || 31.1 || .450 || – || .714 || 5.9 || 3.7 || .6 || .1 || 10.6
|-
| align="left" | 1982
| align="left" | Phoenix
| 7 || – || 33.3 || .522 || – || .786 || 7.9 || 3.7 || 2.0 || .7 || 16.9
|-
| align="left" | 1983
| align="left" | Phoenix
| 3 || – || 28.0 || .469 || – || .714 || 6.0 || 4.7 || .6 || 1.7 || 11.7
|-
| align="left" | 1984
| align="left" | Phoenix
| 17 || – || 18.4 || .421 || – || .679 || 5.1 || 2.5 || 1.0 || .6 || 8.4
|-
| align="left" | 1985
| align="left" | Phoenix
| 3 || 3 || 26.3 || .500 || – || .833 || 5.7 || 3.7 || 2.3 || 0.3 || 17.0
|- class="sortbottom"
| style="text-align:center;" colspan="2"| Career
| 78 || – || 29.3 || .473 || – || .766 || 7.5 || 4.1 || 1.1 || .9 || 13.8

See also
List of NBA players who have spent their entire career with one franchise

References

External links

1954 births
Living people
All-American college men's basketball players
American men's basketball players
Basketball players from Kansas
Basketball players from Phoenix, Arizona
Centers (basketball)
Medalists at the 1973 Summer Universiade
National Basketball Association All-Stars
National Basketball Association players with retired numbers
Oklahoma Sooners men's basketball players
Parade High School All-Americans (boys' basketball)
Phoenix Suns draft picks
Phoenix Suns players
Power forwards (basketball)
Sportspeople from Lawrence, Kansas
Universiade gold medalists for the United States
Universiade medalists in basketball
Utah Stars draft picks